Henry H. Bickford (March 13, 1838 – May 20, 1917) was an American soldier who received the Medal of Honor for valor during the American Civil War.

Biography
Bickford enlisted in the Army from Hartland, New York in October 1861. He received the Medal of Honor on March 26, 1865, for his actions at the Battle of Waynesboro, Virginia. He mustered out with his regiment in June 1865.

Medal of Honor citation
Citation:

 Recapture of flag.

See also

List of American Civil War Medal of Honor recipients: A-F

References

External links

Military Times

1838 births
1917 deaths
Union Army soldiers
United States Army Medal of Honor recipients
People of Michigan in the American Civil War
American Civil War recipients of the Medal of Honor
People from Ypsilanti, Michigan
People from Hartland, New York